The Shree Vajreshwari Yogini Devi Mandir is a Hindu temple dedicated to the goddess Vajreshwari, located in the town Vajreshwari, 75 km away from Mumbai. The town, earlier known as Vadvali, was renamed Vajreshwari in honour of the presiding deity of the temple.

Location
The town of Vajreshwari, on banks of the river Tansa,  lies in Bhiwandi city, Thane district, Maharashtra, India It is 27.6 km away from the nearest station of Virar on the Western Railway line and 31 km from the nearest station of Khadavli on the Central Railway line. The temple is located near the post office of Vajreshwari town, on the Mandagiri hillock, which was formed out of a volcanic eruption and is surrounded by hills on all sides.

Legends
The Puranas mention the region of Vadvali as a place visited by Rama and Parashurama, avatars of the god Vishnu. The legend says that Parashurama performed a yajna (fire offering) at Vadvali and the hills of volcanic ash in the area are its residue.

The primary deity of the temple, Vajreshwari, also spelled Vajreshvari, also known as Vajrábái and Vajrayogini, is considered an incarnation of the goddess Parvati or Aadi-Maya on earth. Her name literally means "the lady of the Vajra (thunderbolt)". There are two legends about the goddess' origins, both associated with the Vajra.

A Rakshasa (demon) named Kalikala or Kalikut troubled the rishis (sages) and humans in the region of Vadvali and waged a war against the devas (gods). Distressed, the gods and sages headed by Vashishta performed the TriChandi yagna, a fire offering to the Goddess, to please Her. An aahuti (offering of ghee in yajna) was not granted to Indra (king of devas). Enraged, Indra hurled his Vajra - one of the most powerful weapons in Hindu mythology- at the yajna. The terrified gods and sages prayed to the Goddess to save them. The Goddess appeared in all her glory at the site and not only swallowed the Vajra and humbled Indra but also killed the demons.Rama requested that the Goddess stay in the region of Vadvali and be known as Vajreshwari. Thus, the Vajreshwari temple was established in this region.

Another legend in the Vajreshvari Mahatmya says that Indra and other devas went to goddess Parvati and requested her to help slay demon Kalikala. Goddess Parvati assured them that she would come to their aid at the right time, and ordered them to fight with the demon. In the battle, Kalikala swallowed or broke all weapons thrown at him. Finally, Indra threw the Vajra at the demon, which Kalikala broke into pieces. From the Vajra emerged the Goddess, who destroyed the demon. The devas extolled her as Vajreshwari and built her temple.

The seventh canto of Navanath Kathasar states that Machindranath served the goddess Vajrabhagawati (Vajreshwari) for a month by giving her a bath of the water of hot springs.

This place is also called Nath Bhoomi, a land of Nathas.

History

The original temple of Vajreshwari was at Gunj,  five miles (8 km) north of Vadavli. It was moved to Vadvali after its destruction by the Portuguese.

In 1739, Chimaji Appa - the younger brother and military commander of Peshwa Baji Rao I - had set up camp in the Vadvali region on his way to capture the Portuguese-held Bassein Fort of Vasai. The fort was unconquerable even after a three-year war. Chimaji Appa prayed to goddess Vajreshwari that if he could conquer the fort and defeat the Portuguese, he would build a temple to her. According to legend, the goddess Vajreshwari appeared in his dream and told him how to conquer the fort. On 16 May, the fort fell and the defeat of the Portuguese in Vasai was complete. To celebrate his victory and to fulfill the vow taken in front of the goddess Vajreshwari, Chimnaji Appa ordered the new Subhedar (governor), Shankar Keshav Phadke, to build the Vajreshwari temple.

The Nagarkhana in the main entrance gate was built by the Gaikwads, Maratha dynasty of Baroda. The stone steps leading to the temple and the Dipamala (a tower of lights) in front of the temple were built by Nanasaheb Chandavadakar, a moneylender from Nashik.

Temple structure
The main gate entrance has a Nagarkhana or drum house, and is built similar to the Bassein Fort's entrance. The temple is also surrounded by a stone wall like a fort. Fifty-two stone steps are to be climbed to reach the main shrine. A golden tortoise is carved on one of the steps and worshipped as Kurma, the tortoise incarnation of Vishnu.

The main shrine has three sections: the main inner sanctum (Garbha gṛha), another sanctum, and a pillared mandapa (assembly hall). The Grabha-griha houses six idols. The saffron murti (idol) of the goddess Vajreshwari with a sword and a gada (mace) in her right and left hands respectively and a trisula (trident) besides her, stands in the centre. Murtis of the goddess Renuka (Parshurama's mother) with a sword and a lotus in her hands, goddess Saptashrungi Mahalakshmi of Vani and a tiger, goddess Vajreshwari's vahana or mount; are to the left of the goddess Vajreshwari. On her right are the murtis of the goddess Kalika (the village goddess) with a lotus and a kamandalu (water pot) and Parshurama armed with a parshu (axe). The goddesses are adorned with silver jewelry and crowns, stand on silver lotuses, and are sheltered by silver umbrellas. The sanctum outside the Garbhagriha has idols of Ganesha, Bhairava, Hanuman and local deities like Moraba devi. The assembly hall has a bell, which devotees ring when entering the shrine and a marble lion, also believed to be the goddess' mount. A  (a structure in which a fire offering is done) is outside the assembly hall.

Smaller shrines on the temple premises are dedicated to Kapileshwar Mahadeva (Shiva), Datta, Hanuman and saints of Giri Gosavi sect. A peepal tree in front of the Hanuman shrine has assumed a form of Ganesha and is worshipped as the deity. The samādhi (tomb) of the 17th century Giri Gosavi saint Godhadebuwa is further up on top of the Gautam hill, behind the Mandagiri hillock.

Temple festivals
The temple celebrates Navaratri (nine nights dedicated to worship of Hindu Goddesses) once from the first day of the fortnight of the waxing moon of the Hindu month of Chaitra (March) to the ninth day of Ram Navami, and then from the first day of the bright half of the Hindu month of Ashvin (October) to the 10th day Vijayadashami.

A fair in honour of Goddess Vajreshwari is held on Amavasya (new moon day) in the month of Chaitra. The fair commences on the 14th day of the fortnight of the waning moon of the month with ceremonial worship of the Goddess. On Amavasya at night, lamps are worshipped. On the next day, the first day of the Hindu month Vaisakha, the ceremonial procession with a Palkhi (palanquin) carrying an image of the goddess, is taken out.

Other festivals the temple celebrates are Shiva worship in the Hindu month of Shravana;  Kojagiri Poornima - full moon day of Hindu month Ashvin; Diwali (festival of lights); Holi (festival of colours); Datta Jayanti (birthday of the deity Datta); Hanuman Jayanti (birthday of the monkey god Hanuman) and Godhadebuwa Jayanti (birthday of the saint Godhadebuwa).

Administration
The temple is taken care of by the Shree Vajreshwari Yogini Devi Public Trust. The members of the Giri Gosavi sect are members of the trust and have been responsible for worship and maintenance of the shrine since its establishment in 1739.

Hot springs
There are around twenty-one hot water springs in a five-kilometer radius of the temple. According to tradition, the hot water is the blood of demons and giants who were slain by the goddess Vajreshwari. According to scientists, their proximity to the former volcano in the region accounts for their creation. Pilgrims who visit the temple also have a holy bath in the springs, which are  named after Hindu deities like Surya (sun-god), Chandra(moon-god), Agni (fire-god), Vayu (wind-god), Rama (Vishnu's incarnation), Sita (Rama's wife and incarnation of the goddess Lakshmi - wife of Vishnu) and Lakshmana (Rama's brother).

Other temples of the goddess Vajreshwari
 A small shrine at Gunj and Katai in Wada taluka, Maharashtra, where the original temple stood
 Vajreshwari Temple, Kangra, Himachal Pradesh: a Shakti Peetha, where a part of the body of the  goddess Sati (first wife of Shiva, who was reborn as Parvati - Shiva's nominally second wife) fell
 Vajreshwari Temple, Ekrukhe Village, Shirdi, Maharashtra. 
 Vajreshwari Temple, Chamba, Himachal Pradesh
 Vajreshwari Temple, Idar, Gujarat, which is located on Idar Mountain with full nature surroundings (by Dhruv Pandya
 Vajreshwari Temple, Solpur, Bidar district, Karnataka state.

References
 Website about the Vajreshwari temple

Notes

External links
  Vajreshwari temple Mumbai

Hindu goddesses
Hindu pilgrimage sites in India
Hindu temples in Maharashtra
Shakti temples
Hot springs of India
Vasai-Virar
Landforms of Maharashtra
Tourist attractions in Palghar district